The Communauté de communes de Montrésor is a former communauté de communes, an intercommunal structure, in the Indre-et-Loire department, in the Centre-Val de Loire region, central France. It was created in December 2000. It was merged into the newly-created Communauté de communes Loches Sud Touraine on 1 January 2017. In 2013, it had a population of 5,645 with its intercommunal seat located in Montrésor.

Composition 
The Communauté de communes comprised the following communes:

Administration

President

References 

Former commune communities of Indre-et-Loire